Hand–Hale Historic District is a national historic district located at Elizabethtown in Essex County, New York. The district contains seven contributing buildings.  It encompasses the Hand House and Law Office, the Hale House and Law Office, and dependencies associated with both properties.

The Hand House is an elegantly formal, two-story Greek Revival style dwelling built in 1849.  The Hand Law Office was built before 1830 as a modest frame building and enlarged in 1865 with a brick addition.

The Hale House was built originally in 1814 and modified extensively in the 1850 to 1870 period.  It is a rambling, two-story frame dwelling.  The Hale Law Office is a modest, one-story gable-roofed structure with a portico.  The remaining buildings are a garage, Hale Barn Complex, and caretaker's cottage.

It was listed on the National Register of Historic Places in 1979.

See also
Augustus C. Hand
Robert S. Hale

References

Historic districts on the National Register of Historic Places in New York (state)
Greek Revival architecture in New York (state)
National Register of Historic Places in Essex County, New York